Mario Morales Coliseum (Spanish: Coliseo Mario Morales) is an indoor sporting arena that is located in Guaynabo, Puerto Rico. It used mainly for basketball, but it can also be used for table tennis or volleyball. The coliseum's seating capacity is 5,500 seats. Apart from the Guaynabo Mets' home games, the coliseum is also used for boxing, roller derby and musical acts. It features a large painting of Mario Morales on the entrance.

The coliseum opened in 1983, originally named Mets Pavilion, but is currently named after Puerto Rican basketball player Mario Morales. It is the home arena of the basketball team the Mets de Guaynabo. It also serves as the home court of the Mets de Guaynabo women's volleyball team in the LVSF.

In August 2020, it also became the venue where COVID-19 testing was done during the COVID-19 pandemic.

References

Buildings and structures in Guaynabo, Puerto Rico
Indoor arenas in Puerto Rico
Basketball venues in Puerto Rico
Volleyball venues in Puerto Rico
1983 establishments in Puerto Rico